Eva Turnová (born 1964) is a Czech singer, songwriter, bass guitarist, teacher, translator and actress. Since 2001 she was a member of The Plastic People of the Universe. She left the band in 2015. Between 1995 and 2001 she was a member of DG 307. Her first husband was Czech actor David Matásek (divorced five years after the wedding). In 2008, she released her first solo album called Eturnity.

External links

References

1964 births
Living people
The Plastic People of the Universe members
Czech actresses
Czech musicians
Charles University alumni